BellSouth Mobility, LLC headquartered in Atlanta, Georgia, was a BellSouth subsidiary.

BellSouth Mobility operated wireless networks using many different wireless communication standards.  The most widely used of these technologies is called Digital AMPS, or D-AMPS. Data services were provided by BellSouth Wireless Data, and used the pre-2.5G Mobitex standard.

History

BellSouth Mobility was a mobile phone network operated by the American landline telephone company BellSouth.  It was founded in 1984 during the breakup of AT&T, which included dividing Advanced Mobile Phone Service, Inc. among the Baby Bells. It ran AMPS and D-AMPS across most of the territory covered by the BellSouth landline company.  In 2000, it became part of the Cingular Wireless network, and the BellSouth branding was dropped; however, the company continued to exist as an operating subsidiary.

 
In 2004, following Cingular's acquisition of AT&T Wireless Services, BellSouth Mobility ceased to exist when it was legally merged into New Cingular Wireless PCS, LLC, the renamed former operating subsidiary of AT&T Wireless Services.

Facts
 BellSouth Mobility used D-AMPS as opposed to Sprint and Verizon's IS-95 technology. Despite this, BellSouth Mobility offered Sprint and Verizon customers roaming onto their older AMPS network.

References

External links

AT&T
Defunct mobile phone companies of the United States
Defunct telecommunications companies of the United States
American companies established in 1983
Telecommunications companies established in 1983 
Telecommunications companies disestablished in 2004
1983 establishments in Georgia (U.S. state)
American companies disestablished in 2004